The New South Wales Department of Communities and Justice, a department of the Government of New South Wales, is responsible for the delivery of services to some of the most disadvantaged individuals, families and communities; and the administration and development of a just and equitable legal system of courts, tribunals, laws and other mechanisms that further the principles of justice in the state of New South Wales, Australia. It also provides services to children and young people, families, people who are homeless, people with a disability, their families and carers, women, and older people. The department is the lead agency of the Stronger Communities cluster of the New South Wales government. 

The department was formed on 1 July 2019 following the 2019 state election that saw the formation of the second Berejiklian ministry. The department assumed most of functions from the former Department of Family and Community Services, and the former Department of Justice. The new department was originally meant to be named Department of Family, Community Services and Justice when announced on the gazette in April 2019, but was changed to its current name in June 2019.

Governing legislation 

Adult correctional operations are governed by the Crimes (Administration of Sentences) Act 1999.

Structure

DCJ is made up of seven divisions, including:
 Courts, Tribunals and Service Delivery, which supports the work of the State's Supreme Court and subordinate courts and tribunals
 Corrections, which manages prisons and supervises offenders in the community, such as parolees and those sentenced to community service
 Child Protection and Permanency, District and Youth Justice Services, which manages child protection, foster care, adoption and juvenile detention centres
 Housing, Disability and District Services and Emergency Management, which provides services to people experiencing homelessness or disability, and communities facing natural disasters
 Law Reform and Legal Services, which includes the State's Director of Public Prosecutions

These are supported by a Strategy, Policy and Commissioning and a Corporate Services division.

Each division is led by a deputy secretary (the deputy secretary for Corrections is known as the  Commissioner of Corrective Services). The deputy secretaries report to secretary, currently vacant, yet filed on an acting basis by Catherine D’Elia.

Ministers
The following ministers are responsible for the administration of the department and its agencies:
 Attorney General, presently The Honourable Mark Speakman 
 Minister for Police, presently the Hon. Paul Toole 
 Minister for Veterans, presently the Hon. David Elliott 
 Minister for Women's Safety and the Prevention of Domestic and Sexual Violence, presently the Hon. Natalie Ward 
 Minister for Corrections, presently the Hon. Dr Geoff Lee 
 Minister for Families and Communities and the Minister for Disability Services, presently the Hon. Natasha Maclaren-Jones 
 Minister for Emergency Services and Resilience, presently the Hon. Steph Cooke 
 Minister for Multiculturalism and the Minister for Seniors, presently The Hon. Mark Coure 

All ministers were appointed with effect from 21 December 2021; with the exception of Mark Speakman who has served as Attorney General since 30 January 2017. Ultimately the ministers are responsible to the Parliament of New South Wales.

Agencies administered 
The following agencies are administered by the department:

 Crown Solicitor's Office
 Disability Council of New South Wales
 Fire and Rescue NSW
 Home and Community Care Program Advisory Committee
 Home Care Service of NSW
 NSW Civil and Administrative Tribunal
 Information and Privacy Commission
 Inspector of Custodial Services
 Legal Aid NSW
 Multicultural NSW Staff Agency
 NSW Businesslink Pty Ltd
 NSW Government Telecommunications Authority
 New South Wales Police Force
 New South Wales Crime Commission
 NSW Registry of Births Deaths & Marriages
 New South Wales Rural Fire Service
 NSW Trustee and Guardian
 Office of the Director of Public Prosecutions
 Office of the NSW Sheriff
 New South Wales State Emergency Service

See also

List of New South Wales government agencies

References

External links
Department of Communities and Justice website

Communities and Justice
2019 establishments in Australia
New South Wales